This is a list of hammerhead sharks.

Sphyrna

Eusphyra

References 

Sphyrnidae